Weekend Wives is a 1928 British silent comedy film directed by Harry Lachman and starring Monty Banks, Jameson Thomas and Estelle Brody. It was made at British International Pictures's Elstree Studios. The film is set in Paris and resort town of Deauville.

One reviewer described it as being "as beautifully photographed, gowned and set as the average Paramount picture and as silly".

Cast
 Monty Banks as Max Ammon
 Jameson Thomas as Henri Monard
 Estelle Brody as Madame le Grand
 Annette Benson as Helene Monard
 George K. Gee as Monsieur le Grand
 Ernest Thesiger as Bertram
 Bebe Brune-Taylor as Yvette
 Koko Arrah as Mickey

References

Bibliography
 Low, Rachael. History of the British Film, 1918-1929. George Allen & Unwin, 1971.
 Wood, Linda. British Films, 1927-1939. British Film Institute, 1986.

External links

1928 films
1928 comedy films
British comedy films
British silent feature films
Films shot at British International Pictures Studios
Films directed by Harry Lachman
British black-and-white films
Films set in Paris
Films set in Normandy
1920s English-language films
1920s British films
Silent comedy films